Nicholas John Piantanida (August 15, 1932 – August 29, 1966) was an American amateur parachute jumper who reached  with his Strato Jump II balloon on February 2, 1966, flying a crewed balloon higher than anyone before, a record that stood until Felix Baumgartner's flight on October 14, 2012.

Early life
Piantanida was born August 15, 1932, and grew up in Union City, New Jersey. He had a younger brother, Vern. When Piantanida was 10 years old, he experimented with homemade parachutes, harnessing a stray neighborhood cat to one in a test drop off the five-story apartment building where they lived. When a neighbor informed Piantanida's parents of this, Piantanida tested the next parachute himself, jumping off a lower roof and breaking his arm. As he grew older, he took up skydiving with a "dogged determination", according to his brother.

As a young man, Piantanida played basketball in East Coast leagues. After high school, he joined the U.S. Army Reserve and shortly thereafter, the U.S. Army for two years, where he earned the rank of corporal.

After his military service, Piantanida and his climbing partner, Walt Tomashoff, became the first people to climb a route on the north side of Auyán-tepui, the plateau in Venezuela from which Angel Falls drops from a cleft near the summit. For this accomplishment he was interviewed on the Today Show.

After his return to the United States, Piantanida worked in an embroidery factory, played basketball at various colleges, and worked as an ironworker on the Verrazano Narrows Bridge.

Skydiving career

In 1963, Piantanida was living in Brick Township, New Jersey, and had a business selling pets when he discovered skydiving. One day after watching jumps at the then new Lakewood Sport Parachuting Center near Lakewood, he began taking lessons and jumping regularly. After making hundreds of jumps and earning a class D expert license, he learned of the  jump from a balloon by Yevgeni Andreyev that gave the official world record for the highest parachute jump to the Soviet Union, and determined to bring the world record back to the United States. (The unofficial record, which Piantanida was also trying to break, was held by Joseph Kittinger of the U.S.)

Piantanida took a job driving trucks in order to give him time to train on weekends. He earnestly studied meteorology, balloon technology and survival systems. As author Craig Ryan put it, he "transformed himself into the director of a one-man aeronautical research program." He obtained money from sponsors, and, after lobbying by a United States Senator, the United States Air Force gave him access to training facilities and David Clark Company loaned him a pressure suit. He assembled a team of volunteers for an attempt at the world free-fall record.

On October 22, 1965, Piantanida made his first attempt at the record in his balloon named Strato Jump I. The attempt ended when a wind shear tore off the top of his balloon, ending the flight at just  and forcing Piantanida to parachute into the Saint Paul, Minnesota city dump.

From that height he had planned to jump from the gondola to set a world record for the highest parachute jump, but was unable to disconnect himself from his oxygen line. He aborted the jump and detached the gondola from the balloon, returning to earth in the gondola without the balloon. Because he did not return to earth with his balloon, his unprecedented altitude is not recognized by the Fédération Aéronautique Internationale as a balloon altitude world record, and because he did not jump from the balloon's gondola at 123,500 feet, he earned no parachute altitude record.

His third attempt occurred on the morning of May 1, 1966. Piantanida donned a bright orange suit and parachute harness. However, ground controllers listening to the communications link with the Strato Jump III were startled by the sound of a whoosh of rushing air and a sudden, cut-off call over the radio to abort. Piantanida's suit had depressurized at about the  mark. Ground controllers immediately jettisoned the balloon at close to  – higher than the cruising altitude for commercial jets – and for 25 minutes Piantanida's gondola parachuted to the ground. He barely survived the descent, having suffered massive tissue damage due to ebullism. The lack of oxygen left him brain damaged and in a coma from which he never recovered. Piantanida died four months later at the Veterans Hospital in Philadelphia, on August 29. He was buried in Holy Cross Cemetery in North Arlington, New Jersey.

The gondola of the Strato Jump III is preserved and displayed in the Boeing Aviation Hangar at the Smithsonian National Air and Space Museum's Steven F. Udvar-Hazy Center in Chantilly, Virginia.

Personal life
Piantanida was Roman Catholic. He married Janice McDowell in 1963, and they had three daughters: Donna, Diane, and Debbie.

A film based on his life, entitled Angry Sky, premiered at the Tribeca Film Festival on April 22, 2015, and on ESPN as part of the 30 for 30 series on July 30, 2015.

References

External links
 An article about Nick Piantanida at Life Magazine online
 An article about Nick Piantanida at The Art of Manliness
 A photo of the Strato-Jump III gondola at the Smithsonian National Air and Space Museum

1932 births
1966 deaths
American aviation record holders
American builders
American men's basketball players
American mountain climbers
American people of Italian descent
American skydivers
American truck drivers
Balloon flight record holders
Burials at Holy Cross Cemetery (North Arlington, New Jersey)
Catholics from New Jersey
Strato Jump III
Flight altitude record holders
People from Brick Township, New Jersey
People from Union City, New Jersey
Place of birth missing
Space diving
United States Army soldiers
Victims of aviation accidents or incidents in 1966